This is a list of animated short films. The list is organized by decade and year, and then alphabetically. The list includes theatrical, television, and direct-to-video films with less than 40 minutes runtime. For a list of films with over 40 minutes of runtime, see List of animated feature films.

List

See also
List of Disney animated shorts
List of one-shot Metro-Goldwyn-Mayer animated shorts
List of Pixar shorts
List of machinima works

Notes

References